Kyle Greentree (born November 15, 1983) is a Canadian former professional ice hockey player. An undrafted player, he previously played two games each for the Philadelphia Flyers and Calgary Flames of the National Hockey League (NHL).

Playing career
Greentree began playing collegiate hockey for the Alaska Fairbanks Nanooks during the 2004-05 season after playing for two seasons with the Victoria Salsa in the British Columbia Hockey League. He led his team in points for all three seasons he played there and got his number retired by the club.

Following his junior season, on March 14, 2007, Greentree decided to forgo his senior season and signed an entry-level contract with the Philadelphia Flyers. In 2007–08 He was assigned to the Flyers AHL affiliate, the Philadelphia Phantoms, to help them in their push to the playoffs. The Flyers recalled Greentree in February 2008 and he played in his first two NHL games.

The Flyers traded Greentree on June 30, 2008 to the Calgary Flames for Tim Ramholt. Greentree spent most of the 2008–09 season with the AHL's Quad City Flames, earning a brief call up with Calgary in February, where he played in two games. Early in the 2009–10 season, he was dealt to the Chicago Blackhawks for Aaron Johnson.

Greentree, a free agent at season's end, signed a two-year contract with the Washington Capitals organization on July 7, 2010. He spent both seasons in the AHL with the Hershey Bears where he recorded 63 points in 74 games in 2010–11 and 34 points in 50 games in 2011–12. Greentree then left to play in Europe.  He spent a year with Croatian club KHL Medveščak Zagreb of the Austrian Hockey League before moving to EHC Basel of the Swiss National League B for the 2013–14 season.

After a season (2014–15) with the Schwenninger Wild Wings, Greentree left the German DEL, signing a one-year deal with Dornbirner EC of the Austrian Hockey League on July 13, 2015. After one season with Dornbirn, on March 19, 2016, Greentree announced his retirement from professional hockey.

Career statistics

References

External links

 

1983 births
Living people
Alaska Nanooks men's ice hockey players
EHC Basel players
Calgary Flames players
Canadian ice hockey left wingers
Dornbirn Bulldogs players
Hershey Bears players
Ice hockey people from British Columbia
Sportspeople from Victoria, British Columbia
KHL Medveščak Zagreb players
Philadelphia Flyers players
Philadelphia Phantoms players
Quad City Flames players
Rockford IceHogs (AHL) players
Schwenninger Wild Wings players
Undrafted National Hockey League players
Victoria Salsa players
Canadian expatriate ice hockey players in Austria
Canadian expatriate ice hockey players in Croatia
Canadian expatriate ice hockey players in Germany
Canadian expatriate ice hockey players in Switzerland